Walworth Road railway station was a railway station in Walworth Road, Southwark, south London, England, on the London Chatham & Dover Railway, which opened on 1 May 1863 on the City Branch to Blackfriars as part of the company's ambitious plan to extend into the City of London. It was originally known as Camberwell Gate before changing its name in 1865.

Along with many other London stations, World War I wartime restraints forced it to close on 3 April 1916. At the time, the closure was considered temporary, but the station never reopened and was subsequently demolished. Today there are virtually no traces that this was once a station. It was planned in the 1950s to open a tube station in Walworth on the Bakerloo line, but the plans were abandoned.

British Rail did consider reopening the station as part of Thameslink in the 1980s but never materialised.

References

Railway stations in Great Britain opened in 1863
Railway stations in Great Britain closed in 1916
Former London, Chatham and Dover Railway stations
Disused railway stations in the London Borough of Southwark
Camberwell